This is a list of all cricketers who have played first-class or List A matches for Pakistan National Shipping Corporation cricket team. The team played 111 first-class matches between 1987 and 2000 and 92 List A matches between 1988 and 2000. Seasons given are first and last seasons; the player did not necessarily play in all the intervening seasons.

Players

 Aamer Ishaq, 1988/89-1995/96
 Abdullah Khan, 1987/88-1989/90
 Afzaal Saeed, 1986/87
 Ahmed Hayat, 1996/97
 Alauddin, 1993/94-1995/96
 Rehan Alikhan, 1993/94-1994/95
 Ali Naqvi, 1998/99
 Ali Raza, 1998/99-1999/00
 Amin Lakhani, 1986/87-1992/93
 Azam Khan, 1993/94-1995/96
 Azeem Hafeez, 1986/87-1988/89
 Azhar Sultan, 1986/87-1987/88
 Bilal Khilji, 1996/97
 Danish Kaneria, 1998/99
 Faisal Athar, 1999/00
 Faisal Iqbal, 1998/99-1999/00
 Farrukh Bari, 1987/88-1994/95
 Ghulam Hussain, 1990/91-1992/93
 Ijaz Ahmed, 1987/88-1990/91
 Iqbal Imam, 1997/98-1999/00
 Iqtidar Ali, 1986/87
 Irfan Fazil, 1998/99
 Irfan Habib, 1989/90
 Irfan Rana, 1990/91
 Kamran Haider, 1995/96
 Kashif Ahmed, 1997/98-1999/00
 Kashif Ibrahim, 1999/00
 Mahmood Hamid, 1987/88-1992/93
 Maisam Hasnain, 1995/96-1996/97
 Majid Saeed, 1996/97
 Manzoor Ali, 1987/88
 Mazhar Qayyum, 1995/96-1998/99
 Mohammad Javed, 1990/91-1992/93
 Mohammad Ramzan, 1998/99-1999/00
 Mohsin Kamal, 1986/87-1998/99
 Mohtashim Rasheed, 1998/99-1999/00
 Mubeen Faraz, 1986/87
 Murtaza Hussain, 1995/96-1996/97
 Mutahir Shah, 1986/87-1999/00
 Nadeem Afzal, 1991/92-1992/93
 Nasir Wasti, 1986/87-1999/00
 Naved Nazir, 1993/94-1994/95
 Nisar Abbas, 1999/00
 Pervez-ul-Hasan, 1987/88-1998/99
 Qaiser Rasheed, 1987/88-1990/91
 Rameez Raja, 1987/88-1991/92
 Rashid Mahmood, 1989/90
 Riaz Sheikh, 1999/00
 Sajid Shah, 1993/94-1996/97
 Sajjad Akbar, 1986/87-1999/00
 Sajjad Ali, 1993/94-1999/00
 Sanaullah Sharif, 1988/89
 Shadab Kabir, 1998/99
 Shahid Anwar, 1986/87
 Shahid Hussain, 1996/97-1997/98
 Shahid Qambrani, 1999/00
 Sher Ali, 1993/94-1996/97
 Siddiq Patni, 1986/87
 Sohail Farooqi, 1989/90-1994/95
 Sohail Jaffar, 1989/90-1995/96
 Sohail Miandad, 1988/89-1992/93
 Sultan Kamdar, 1990/91
 Tahir Butt, 1996/97-1998/99
 Tahir Mahmood, 1993/94-1996/97
 Tariq Hussain, 1993/94-1997/98
 Umar Rasheed, 1997/98-1999/00
 Yasir Shakeeb, 1998/99-1999/00
 Zafar Iqbal, 1990/91-1992/93
 Zeeshan Siddiqi, 1995/96-1996/97
 Zeeshan Tanvir, 1999/00

References

Pakistan National Shipping Corporation cricketers